Coorparoo Football Club is an Australian rules football club based in the Brisbane suburb of Coorparoo from 1935 until the senior club folded in 1995. The club left the QAFL following the 1993 season due to the financial strain experienced since the recent introduction of a minimum salary cap, and joined the Brisbane Australian Football League (BAFL) for the 1994 and 1995 seasons. 

The "Coorparoo Junior Australian Football Club" has continued as a stand-alone club since 1996 to the present. The "Coorparoo (Seniors) Kings Football Club" also operates out of the same oval in Birubi Street. Both teams club colours are navy blue with a white monogram.

History 
Formed in 1935, Coorparoo played in the QAFL from 1941 to 1993. They were nicknamed the Roos. For the 1953 and 1954 seasons they merged with Yeronga.

Footballers to have played or coached at the club include Carl Ditterich, Jason Dunstall, Kevin O'Keeffe, Terry O'Neill, Michael Gibson, David Wearne, Stephen Wearne, John Pitura, Bill Ryan and Mark Maclure.

When Carl Ditterich left Coorparoo he returned with a notice to sue (for breach of contract) following his sacking by the club's board. The awarded $36 000 placed the club in financial hardship which the Q.A.F.L. premierships in 1984 and 1986 momentarily covered, but in the long term, without an improving local demographic made the club difficult to keep afloat.  The insistence of the Q.A.F.L. to introduce a minimum salary cap by the end of the decade would prove catastrophic.

After the 1995 season, the original Coorparoo club sold the facilities to the Brisbane Bears, and although the last senior team to play was in 1995, the name continues in the form of the Coorparoo Junior Australian football club. Twenty years after the original QAFL club folded, the Junior football club is currently following the legacy, with multiple teams in each age group as well as a popular Auskick venue on weekends.

Honours
 QAFL Premiers (6): 1960, 1963, 1964, 1968, 1984, 1986
 Grogan Medalists (5):
 Tom Calder 1948, 1950                                                  
 Bevis Howell 1952                                                               
 John Golding 1959                                                             
 Ken Grimley 1964                                                            
 Brendan McMullen 1984, 1986                                            
 Joe Grant Medalists (2)                                                        
 Gary Becker 1984
 Brendan McMullen 1986
 Ray Hughson Medalists (3)
 1954 Darryl Sanders - Coorparoo/Yeronga 92 Goals
 1980 Robert Fox - Coorparoo 103 Goals
 1984 Jason Dunstall - Coorparoo 73 Goals
 Most Games (Top 12)
 5th Wayne Stewart - Coorparoo/Mayne  289 Games
 6th Dick Verdon -  Coorparoo/ Sandgate  283 Games
 9th Des Hughes - Coorparoo  279 Games
 11th Vic Giffin - Coorparoo  263 Games

QAFL Hall Of Fame (15)

 Tom Calder
 Michael Gibson
 Ken Grimley
 Des Hughes
 Shane Junker
 Ray Marshall
 Noel McGuiness
 Brendan McMullen
 Kevin O'Keefe
 Terry O'Neill
 Bill Ryan
 Darryl Sanders
 Wayne Stewart
 Dick Verdon
 Terry Moule ( Coached 1975 )
 Darren Morris 

Notes

AFLQ Team Of The Century (6)
 Dick Verdon
 Wayne Stewart
 Des Hughes
 Jason Dunstall (VC)
 Ken Grimley
 Noel McGuiness

QAFL Legends (2)
Dick Verdon
Jason Dunstall

See also
 Coorparoo Football Club (1996)

References

External links
 Coorparoo Junior AFC

Coorparoo
Australian rules football clubs in Brisbane
1935 establishments in Australia
1995 disestablishments in Australia
Australian rules football clubs established in 1935
Coorparoo, Queensland
Australian rules football clubs disestablished in 1995